This is a list of commercial films which were shot at least partly in the Bahamas.

Films
 Desperate Journey (1942)
 20,000 Leagues Under the Sea (1954)
 Flipper's New Adventure (1964)
 Help! (1965)
 Thunderball (1965)
 Around the World Under the Sea (1966)
 You Only Live Twice (1967)
 The Day of the Dolphin (1973)
 The Next Man (1976)
 The Spy Who Loved Me (1977)
 Moonraker (1979)
 The Island (1980)
 For Your Eyes Only (1981)
 Never Say Never Again (1983)
 Splash (1984)
 Wet Gold (1984)
 Cocoon (1985)
 Jaws: The Revenge (1987)
 Cocoon: The Return (1988)
 Shoot to Kill (1988)
 The Silence of the Lambs (1991)
 Jefford Curre' Paradise Intrigue (1994)
 My Father the Hero (1994)
 Flipper (1996)
 Zeus and Roxanne (1997)
 The Insider (1999)
 Holiday in the Sun (2001)
 After the Sunset (2004)
 Into the Blue (2005)
 Casino Royale (2006)
 Pirates of the Caribbean: Dead Man's Chest (2006)
 Pirates of the Caribbean: At World's End (2007)
 Miracle at St. Anna (2008)
 Fool's Gold (2008)
 Blue (2009)

See also
 List of Bahamian films

 
Bahamian films
Film
Bahamas